Sunday is the debut feature film of Croatian film director Lordan Zafranović, premiering in 1969. Zafranović made a film while he was still a student. The plot follows a Sunday in life of a young man who wanders along streets of Split along with three friends, entering a range of bizarre situations, culminating in hijacking of a bus and standoff with police.

Sunday is based on Zafranović's eponymous short film from 1961. Zafranović wrote the screenplay with  after an idea by Ranko Kursar. The cinematographer was Predrag "Pega" Popović, while the main role was assigned to Goran Marković, later a successful director, both Zafranović's friends from the Prague Film School. The main woman's role was given to Nada Abrus, a high-school student from Split. The film was recorded in 35 days during 1968. The director described the theme as a "clash between natures of a young revolting individual and the civilization as we know it". Sunday has a certain elements of youthful, modernist extravagance.

Cast
 Goran Marković as Ivan
 Dragomir Čumić as Puso
 Martin Crvelin as Saša
 Gordan Pičuljan as Mladen
 Nada Abrus as Marija, Ivan's girlfriend
 Relja Bašić
 Antun Nalis
 Mia Oremović
 Olga Pivac

References

External links
 

1969 films
1960s Croatian-language films
Yugoslav drama films
1969 directorial debut films
Croatian black-and-white films